Deltour is a surname. Notable people with the surname include:

Carlos Deltour (1864–1920), French rower
Félix Deltour (1822–1904), French Latinist
Hubert Deltour (1911–1993), Belgian racing cyclist
Kedist Deltour (born 1997), Belgian model and beauty pageant titleholder
Sylvaine Deltour (born 1953), French sprint canoer